IceCube, also known as Earth-1, was a 3U CubeSat satellite funded and developed by NASA. Its goal was to demonstrate and map ice clouds through the use of its 883 GHz radiometer.

Objectives 
IceCube was built to map ice clouds globally. It had a submillimeter radiometer to overcome the limitation of ice particles in clouds being opaque in the infrared and visible spectrums. It was made to demonstrate a 833-gigahertz submillimeter-wave receiver as part of a technology demonstration mission.

Design 
IceCube was a Sun-pointing spin-stabilized 3U CubeSat with two solar panel arrays. In its compact form, it occupied a volume of 10 x 10 x 30cm.

Instruments 
IceCube had a 883 GHz radiometer allowing the penetration of cloud layers and measurement of ice mass. At 883 GHz, radiation is highly sensitive to scattering allowing it to interact with ice in the clouds.

Launch and mission 

Cygnus OA-7 launched on April 18, 2017 as the seventh flight of the Cygnus spacecraft to the ISS as under NASA's Commercial Resupply Services program. The Cygnus spacecraft docked with the ISS on April 2, 2017.

IceCube was deployed from the ISS via the Nanoracks CubeSat Deployer along with several other CubeSats on May 16, 2017. It re-entered the Earth's atmosphere on October 3, 2018, ending its mission.

See also 
Lunar IceCube

References 

2017 in spaceflight
Satellites deployed from the International Space Station
CubeSats